u̠t-Ma'in or Fakai is a Northwest Kainji dialect continuum spoken by 36,000 people in Nigeria. There are numerous rather divergent dialects: 
Kag (Puku, Fakanchi, Et-Kag)
Jiir (Gelanchi, Et-Jiir)
Kur (Kere, Kar, Keri-Ni, Kelli-Ni, Kelanchi, Kelinci)
Zuksun (Zussun, Et-Zuksun)
Ror (Et-Maror, Tudanchi, Er-Gwar)
Fer (Fere, Et-Fer, Wipsi-Ni, Kukum)
Us (Et-Us)
Koor (Kulu)

Names
Names for the u̠t-Ma'in peoples and languages from Blench (2012):

Geographic distribution
The Ut-Ma'in language is spoken mainly in Kebbi State (especially Fakai) and Sokoto State (Kebbe) but also in Niger State (Kontagora) and Zamfara State.

References

Further reading
A sociolinguistic survey of the people of the Fakai district

Northwest Kainji languages
Languages of Nigeria